Leonardo Maloku (born 18 May 1998) is an Albanian professional footballer who plays as a right-back for Spanish club San Roque and the Albania national under-21 team.

Club career

Early career

Pescara
He signed his first professional contrat with Pescara on 29 July 2016 for 5 years valid until 2021. He was gathered for the first time with the first team in the pre-season preparatory stage and was activated in all 3 friendly games mading impressive performances convincing coach Massimo Oddo and the club to sign with him the professional contract.

Loan to Santarcangelo
He made his debut on 27 August 2017 against Pordenone in the 2017–18 Serie C Group B (North & Central East) opening season, playing the full 90-minutes under coach Giuseppe Angelini in a 0–1 loss with a 90'+4 minute goal.

Loan to Fermana
On 31 January 2019, he joined Fermana on loan.

San Roque
On 4 August 2019, he signed with Spanish club San Roque.

International career
He received his first call up for the Albania under-20 side by same coach of the under-21 team Alban Bushi for the friendly match against Georgia U20 on 14 November 2017. He debuted for under-20 team against Georgia by playing as a starter until 55th minute when he was substituted off for Amer Duka with score at 1–0 and the entire match finished in an eventual 3–0 loss.

Career statistics

Club

References

External links

 Leonardo Maloku profile at FSHF.org

1998 births
Living people
Footballers from Tirana
Albanian footballers
Albania youth international footballers
Albania under-21 international footballers
Association football fullbacks
Santarcangelo Calcio players
Alma Juventus Fano 1906 players
Fermana F.C. players
CD San Roque de Lepe footballers
Serie B players
Serie C players
Tercera División players
Albanian expatriate footballers
Albanian expatriate sportspeople in Italy
Albanian expatriate sportspeople in Spain
Expatriate footballers in Italy
Expatriate footballers in Spain